Martinj Vrh (in older sources also Sveti Martinj Vrh) is a settlement in the Municipality of Železniki in the Upper Carniola region of Slovenia.

Name
Martinj Vrh was attested in historical sources as Martingenpotoch in 1291 and 1318, and as Martinvrch in 1500.

References

External links
Martinj Vrh at Geopedia

Populated places in the Municipality of Železniki